The French Studies Bulletin: A Quarterly Supplement is a quarterly peer-reviewed academic journal published by Oxford University Press on behalf of the Society for French Studies. It covers all aspects of French or francophone literature, thought, culture, politics, or film. The journal is the sister publication of French Studies, but publishes shorter articles of up to 2,000 words. It was established in 1981.

External links

1981 establishments in the United Kingdom
French studies journals
Quarterly journals
Publications established in 1981
Oxford University Press academic journals